Gliese 649 is a red dwarf star in the constellation of Hercules, located roughly 34 light years from the Sun. The star has been found to host an extrasolar planet.

A planetary companion
According to Johnson et al. (2010) a Saturn-mass planet has been detected around the red dwarf star. It yields 32.8% of Jupiter's mass and is located 1.15 astronomical units from its star in eccentric orbit (e=0.3). Assuming a luminosity of 4.5% that of the Sun, the habitable zone is located at 0.21 AUs, thus the planet should be as cold as if it were located at 5.5 AUs from a Solar-like star. Also accounting different periastron and apastron positions of 0.8 and 1.49 AUs respectively, the planet could likely show seasonal temperature changes.

Debris disk
Using results from the Herschel Space Observatory survey of 21 late-type stars carried out in 2010, a debris disk was discovered between approximately 6 and 30 au. The disk was not detected at 22µm by NASA's Wide-field Infrared Survey Explorer so therefore it is likely to be below 100 Kelvin and similar to the Kuiper belt. The disk was marginally resolved, appearing very asymmetric, and so is probably consistent with being closer to edge-on, rather than face-on, in its inclination.

References

See also
 Gliese 317
 Gliese 849
 List of extrasolar planets

Hercules (constellation)
M-type main-sequence stars
0649
083043
BD+25 3173
Planetary systems with one confirmed planet
Circumstellar disks